Anna Moana Rosa Pozzi (27 April 1961 – 15 September 1994), also known mononymously as Moana, was an Italian pornographic actress, television personality and politician.

Early life
Pozzi was born in Genoa, Liguria, Italy, the daughter of Alfredo Pozzi, a nuclear engineer, and Rosanna, a housewife. Her name, Moana, is a Polynesian name meaning "ocean". In her youth, Pozzi lived for periods of time in Canada and Brazil, due to the nature of her father's work requiring him to travel. By the time she was thirteen years old, the family had returned to their native Italy, where she finished school. In 1979, a few weeks before her 18th birthday, she gave birth to her only child, a son named Simone, who was raised by her parents and told that his mother was his older sister. The family moved to France in 1980 and Pozzi, then 19 years old, decided to stay in Rome.

In Rome, Pozzi started working as a model and studied acting. Sometimes she performed in television advertisements or as a walk-on in comedy movies. In 1981, she performed in her first hardcore movie, Valentina, ragazza in calore (Valentina, Girl in Heat), credited as Linda Heveret. A minor scandal ensued since, at the same time the movie was in theatres, she was still working on a children's television programme, Tip Tap Club, on Rete 2. She denied being the same person, but was suspended from television anyway.  This gave Pozzi her first popularity in newspapers and magazines.  In 1985, Federico Fellini wanted her to perform in his movie Ginger and Fred.

Career
In 1986, Pozzi met Riccardo Schicchi, manager of Diva Futura. Her first A-movie in hard core was Fantastica Moana, where she used her real name for the first time. She also starred in Curve Deliziose (Delicious Curves) next to Cicciolina and others, the first live show in Italy where naked models would masturbate onstage.  This caused scandal and accusations of outrageous obscenity. She became famous in the hardcore pornography business and eclipsed the popularity of Cicciolina in Italy.  At the same time Cicciolina stopped doing porn in order to pursue a political career in the Italian Parliament. Pozzi's appearances on television also caused scandal. In the show Matrjoska by Antonio Ricci, she used to appear on stage completely naked or just wrapped in a transparent plastic veil.  She became increasingly featured in magazines and newspapers and often appeared on the front page and magazine covers. She was also appreciated for her distinctive intelligence, defying the cliché of the brainless pinup.  She cultivated intellectuals, writers, and artists such as Mario Schifano or Dario Bellezza.

Early 1990s
Pozzi was conscious of her role in show business. In interviews she always spoke of what she wanted to be for public opinion: sexy, sophisticated, intelligent, open-minded, worldly.

In 1991, Pozzi published her first book Moana's Philosophy where she listed, with marks from 4 to 9.5, twenty famous celebrities who had been her lovers. The list included actors such as Robert De Niro, Harvey Keitel, Roberto Benigni and Massimo Troisi, soccer players like Paulo Roberto Falcão and Marco Tardelli, writers including Luciano De Crescenzo.  The name of the most famous one, the prime minister Bettino Craxi, who was her lover in 1981, was hidden as "the politician". 

In 1992, Pozzi co-founded, with Hungarian Ilona Staller "Cicciolina", the Love Party of Italy, whose political program included legalization of brothels, better sex education and the creation of "love parks". She ran for the mayor of Rome and received about 1 per cent of votes. No one was elected, but her popularity reached its pinnacle and the various Italian TV anchors wanted to interview her. Stylist Karl Lagerfeld wanted her on the catwalk in 1993. Pozzi became so popular that she was a protagonist for an animated cartoon created by the Italian cartoonist Mario Verger, with herself co-directing. Again Verger, by himself, dedicated to Pozzi another cartoon, I Remember Moana, 1995, that gained praise by film critics Marco Giusti and Enrico Ghezzi, and was transmitted in Fuori Orario. It also won a Special Mention at the Erotic Film Festival in the US. 

Her sister Maria Tamiko "Mima" Pozzi also became a porn actress with the stage name Baby Pozzi.

Pozzi performed in about 100 porn movies, mostly in Italy, but also some in Los Angeles with Gerard Damiano as director. She sold about 1 million videotapes. She was on the covers of 50 major magazines, not including pictorials in porn magazines. She was reportedly worth more than Lire 50 billion (1990 prices), about 26 million Euros.

Death and aftermath
In 1994, Pozzi fell ill, unable to eat without vomiting, and losing weight. She took time off from work to travel with her husband Antonio Di Ciesco to India and then to France. She died in Lyon, France, on 15 September 1994, at the age of 33, reportedly of liver cancer. The cause of her death has been a subject of debate, with numerous suggestions being made, ranging from Pozzi being a spy for the KGB, killed by exposure to radioactive polonium, to dying from the result of assisted suicide orchestrated by her husband. Some people have questioned whether or not Pozzi died, and believe she may have faked her death to escape fame. In 2006, over a decade after her death, the Italian crime show Chi l'ha visto? aired her death certificate which showed she had indeed died of liver cancer, along with her cremation certificate, showing her ashes had been given to family members. Despite the release of paperwork and interviews with family members, the public and media has continued to speculate on how or if Pozzi died.

In 2006, Simone Pozzi revealed to the public that he was her son, not her brother as he had been raised to believe. As told by him, he was born in 1979, just a few weeks before his mother's 18th birthday, and was told growing up that his grandparents were his parents and that his mother was his older sister, to avoid the scandal of an out-of-wedlock birth in the family. Pozzi's mother confirmed the claims. Later that year, he, along with investigative journalist Francesca Parravicini, published a book about Pozzi's personality, career and relationships titled Moana, tutta la verità (English: Moana, the Whole Truth).

Legacy
Pozzi was a popular and beloved figure in Italy and made a name for herself outside of the pornography industry. Following her death, The New Yorker remarked on the country being in mourning as the result of her passing and the Archbishop of Naples gave a homily in her honor. During her lifetime, Pozzi supported LGBT rights, denounced the Mafia, and campaigned for legalization of sex work. Upon her death, she left much of her fortune to cancer research. Since she remains a well-known figure in Italy, the Walt Disney Company made the decision to release the animated film Moana as Oceania in Italy and changed the title character's name to Vaiana for that localization.

Pozzi inspired the main character of the 1999 film Guardami (Look at Me).

In 2009 a miniseries based on her life was directed by Alfredo Peyretti and starred Violante Placido in the title role.

In 2010 her former manager Riccardo Schicchi produced and directed I Segreti di Moana (The Secrets of Moana), in which the title role was played by Vittoria Risi.

Bibliography
 Moana Pozzi, La filosofia di Moana, Moana's Club Edizioni, Roma, 1991 (self-produced).
 Moana Pozzi, Il sesso secondo Moana, Edizioni Moana's Club Edizioni, Roma, 1992 (self-produced).
 Noa Bonetti, Un'amica di nome Moana. Confidenze a cuore aperto di un'indimenticabile star a luci rosse, Sperling & Kupfer Editori, Milano, 1994, .
 Brunetto Fantauzzi, La pornoViva, il terribile segreto di Moana, Flash Edizioni, Roma 1995.
 Patrizia D'Agostino – Antoni Tentori – Alda Teodorani, Pornodive, Castelvecchi Editore, Roma, 1995, .
 Andrea Di Quarto – Michele Giordano, Moana e le altre. Vent'anni di cinema porno in Italia, Gremese Editore, 1997, .
 Tommaso Trini, Moana. Ultimo mito, Prearo Editore, Roma, 2003, .
 Ermanno Krumm, Mimmo Rotella – Moana ultimo mito, Prearo Editore, Roma, 2003.
 Marco Giusti, Moana, Mondadori Editore, Milano, 2004, .
 Brunetto Fantauzzi, E... viva Moana, giallo politico! Chi ha ucciso la pornodiva del potere, 2005.
 Francesca Parravicini, Moana, tutta la verità, Aliberti Editore, Reggio Emilia, 2006, .
 Brunetto Fantauzzi, Moana. La spia nel letto del potere, Edizioni Nuove Srl, 2006.
 Brunetto Fantauzzi, Moana. Mistero per sempre, Edizioni Nuove Srl, 2007.

References

External links

 Official website of Moana Pozzi Association 
 The original death register shown in a TV programme 
 Moana Pozzi Online
 
 
 
 

20th-century Italian actresses
Italian pornographic film actresses
Italian television personalities
Deaths from cancer in France
Deaths from liver cancer
Actors from Genoa
1961 births
1994 deaths
Politicians from Genoa